The Zhiyuan class were two protected cruisers built during the late stages of the Qing dynasty, in the build order of  and later Jingyuan. They were built as part of Li Hongzhang's effort to modernize the Imperial Chinese Fleet in the late 19th century.

Both cruisers took part in the Battle of Yalu River during the First Sino-Japanese War, with Zhiyuan being sunk in battle and Jingyuan damaged. Jingyuan was later sunk during the Battle of Weihaiwei in January 1895.

References

Naval ships of China
Military history of the Qing dynasty
Cruisers of Imperial China
Cruiser classes